Sports Life Stories is an ITV Sport documentary series shown on ITV4 and ITV. Each episode is devoted to one sporting great and lets them tell their life story alongside contributions from friends and family as well as sporting archive. The first episode told the story of boxer Barry McGuigan and aired in October 2012 on ITV4. Reporters on the series have included Gabriel Clarke, Ned Boulting, Adam Darke and Leon Mann.

Episode guide

Series 1

Series 2

Series 3

Critical success 
Sports Life Stories has been described as a 'first-class interview series' by broadcaster Des Lynam and as 'the best sports documentary series on television' by TV critic Ian Hyland. Sports Life Stories was awarded Television Programme of the Year 2013 at the Sports Journalists' Association Awards on 24 March 2014.

References 

2012 British television series debuts
ITV Sport
Television series by ITV Studios